Rodger Denis Fox  (born 7 January 1953) is a New Zealand trombonist, jazz educator, recording artist and leader of the Rodger Fox Big Band. He founded his jazz band in 1973 and has toured extensively in New Zealand and overseas, playing at international jazz festivals including Montreux and Monterey. He is a jazz educator and teaches at the New Zealand School of Music at Victoria University of Wellington.

Early life 
Fox was born in Christchurch in 1953, the son of Louis and Betty Fox. Both his parents were musicians. Betty taught piano and Louis played in and conducted brass bands, becoming head of music at Mana College in Wellington where his son was educated. Fox initially played the trumpet, changing to the trombone when that instrument was needed in the Mana College band. He played in the local brass band, the Wellington Youth Orchestra and the National Youth Orchestra in 1969 and 1970. He passed the Royal College of Music trombone and theory exam in 1970. His brother played the trombone and his sisters the clarinet and saxophone. On leaving school Fox worked for Chappells Music Publishing and in the Golden Horn Music shop. His favourite jazz band was Woody Herman's and he acknowledges Herman as a huge influence on his playing.

Career 
Fox was intending to pursue a career in classical music; he was offered a place as an orchestral trainee with the New Zealand Symphony Orchestra but brass players were not accepted onto the scheme that year as brass and woodwind players were not finding employment. Instead he joined the band Quincy Conserve, which he credits as an invaluable training ground for running a band and touring.

In 1973 Fox and Alan Nelson formed an 18 piece band, the Golden Horn Big Band, named after the music shop where he worked. At the time Fox found that older musicians were not affording younger players the opportunities to play which spurred him to start his own band. The Rodger Fox Big Band succeeded the Golden Horn band.

The Rodger Fox Big Band has toured in New Zealand and overseas, playing at jazz festivals in Monterey, Montreux, Wichita and Manly. In 1978 they toured Australia.  They appeared at the Montreux Jazz Festival in 1980 and 1981, the first New Zealand band to play at Montreux. In 1980 they toured in the United States and recorded an album at the Vanguard Studio in New York. The following year they toured Poland and played at Ronnie Scott's Jazz Club in London. They played at the Monterey Jazz Festival in 2001, 2006 and 2017.

Fox has maintained that New Zealand does not have its own local jazz style and that jazz is an American music. In support of this view and to encourage the development of jazz playing and his initiatives in jazz education Fox has brought many American jazz musicians to New Zealand to perform with his band: singer Diane Schuur, trumpeter Arturo Sandoval, pianist Bill Cunliffe, trumpeter Maynard Ferguson, saxophonist Bruce Johnstone, saxophonist Michael Brecker, trumpeter Bobby Shew, guitarist Robben Ford, singer Lydia Pense, and singer Randy Crawford. The band's 20th anniversary tour starred trombonist Bill Reichenbach, trumpeter Gary Grant, singer David Clayton-Thomas (vocalist of Blood, Sweat and Tears) and local musician Midge Marsden. Organist Joey de Francesco and singer Brenda Boykin performed with the band for the 40th anniversary tour. Fox toured New Zealand in 2023 to mark 50 years since the founding of the Big Band. The concert was called 'The Big Drum Off' and featured guest drummers Dennis Chambers, Gregg Bissonette and Peter Erskine.

Noticing the paucity of New Zealand jazz arrangements Fox produced Reimagined! in 2022, an album of songs by New Zealand singer Dave Dobbyn. Music from the album would be used in another initiative to encourage school jazz bands to play New Zealand music.

Fox has collaborated with classical musicians. In 2016 he toured his band with the New Zealand Symphony in a programme called Swing into Spring conducted by Hamish McKeich with trumpet and flugelhorn player Allen Vituzzi as soloist. Fox and New Zealand classical pianist Michael Houstoun worked together to record a CD Concerti in 2017. They collaborated again in 2021 at the Wellington Jazz Festival with Houstoun playing compositions and arrangements by Bill Cunliffe. In 2020 tenor Simon O'Neill performed Wagner arias accompanied by the band at a concert in Palmerston North.

Fox's band has provided work opportunities for jazz musicians and he regards the band as a training ground for young players. He has advocated for better funding of jazz performance and for a jazz orchestra. He maintains that while the country has a national orchestra, a ballet company and regional orchestras there is no national big band to provide opportunities and employment for younger players. The band has run as a non-profit organisation with the earnings being used to promote educational opportunities, to bring musicians from overseas to work with the band, or to fund trips to jazz festivals or jazz education conferences.

In the early 1980s Fox, saxophonist Colin Hemmingsen and percussionist Bud Jones established the first jazz courses at the Wellington Polytechnic (later Massey University). Fox became a senior lecturer at the New Zealand School of Music in Wellington (initially a Massey University and Victoria University joint venture but later part of Victoria University).

As well as his university teaching Fox has tutored and mentored young jazz musicians in schools and at other jazz workshops. In 2019 he organised a series of one day workshops and concerts around the country, delivered by the band and international musicians and educators. The aim was to give students exposure to world-class educators and performers and a greater understanding of jazz artistry.

In 1999 he attended the Jazz Educators' Conference in Anaheim and in 2020 the Jazz Education Network conference in New Orleans.

Awards and honours 
Fox has won the Aotearoa Music Award (Tui) for New Zealand jazz recording of the year on four occasions: in 1983, 2001, 2004 and 2012. In the 2003 Queen's Birthday Honours, he was appointed an Officer of the New Zealand Order of Merit, for services to music. He was conferred with an honorary doctorate (DMus) by Massey University in 2005.

In the 2022 New Year Honours, Fox was promoted to Companion of the New Zealand Order of Merit, for services to music.

Selected discography

References

External links 
 Photo of Rodger Fox conducting the New Zealand School of Music Big Band, 2013 on Te Ara
 Brilliant Brass – Rodger Fox. Interview with David Bremner on RNZ, 2015
 NZ Live – the Rodger Fox Big Band. RNZ, 2017
Rodger Fox profile and discography on AudioCulture
Rodger Fox Big Band website
Rodger Fox goes big with kiwi pop. Interview on RNZ, 1 January 2022

1953 births
Living people
Companions of the New Zealand Order of Merit
20th-century New Zealand musicians
New Zealand jazz musicians
Trombonists
21st-century New Zealand musicians
People from Christchurch
People educated at Mana College
Academic staff of the Victoria University of Wellington